Likhutamakoshi is a Rural municipality located within the Ramechhap District of the Bagmati Province of Nepal.
The municipality spans  of area, with a total population of 23,109 according to a 2011 Nepal census.

On March 10, 2017, the Government of Nepal restructured the local level bodies into 753 new local level structures.
The previous Duragau, Saipu, Bijulikot, Naga Daha, Khimti and Tilpung VDCs were merged to form Likhutamakoshi Rural Municipality.
Likhutamakoshi is divided into 7 wards, with Bijulikot declared the administrative center of the rural municipality.

Demographics
At the time of the 2011 Nepal census, Likhutamakoshi Rural Municipality had a population of 23,135. Of these, 56.6% spoke Nepali, 23.1% Tamang, 7.2% Magar, 6.4% Sunwar, 4.4% Newar, 0.9% Yolmo, 0.3% Majhi, 0.2% Gurung and 0.9% other languages as their first language.

In terms of ethnicity/caste, 31.8% were Chhetri, 23.6% Tamang, 10.3% Magar, 10.1% Newar, 6.5% Sunuwar, 5.5% Hill Brahmin, 3.2% Kami, 2.7% Sarki, 2.0% Damai/Dholi and 4.3% others.

In terms of religion, 70.7% were Hindu, 26.0% Buddhist, 2.5% Christian, 0.3% Bon and 0.5% others.

References

External links
official website of the rural municipality

Rural municipalities in Ramechhap District
Rural municipalities of Nepal established in 2017